Unbowed: A Memoir is a 2006 autobiography written by 2004 Nobel Peace Prize Laureate Wangari Maathai. The book was published by the Knopf Publishing Group.

Summary
Maathai discusses her life from childhood until she was awarded the Nobel Peace Prize in 2004. She discusses her childhood, education in the United States and her return to Kenya, moving on to her life as an environmentalist and political activist, culminating with the victory of the opposition in the 2002, elections against the ruling KANU party and her election to parliament, followed shortly after by the Nobel Prize. Maathai stresses the connection between environmental conservation and good governance.

References

2006 non-fiction books
Memoirs
Alfred A. Knopf books
Books about activists